Erna Schneider Hoover (born June 19, 1926) is an American mathematician notable for inventing a computerized telephone switching method which "revolutionized modern communication" according to several reports. It prevented system overloads by monitoring call center traffic and prioritizing tasks on phone switching systems to enable more robust service during peak calling times. At Bell Laboratories where she worked for over 32 years, Hoover was described as an important pioneer for women in the field of computer technology.

Early life
Erna Schneider was born on June 19, 1926, in Irvington, New Jersey. Her family lived in South Orange, New Jersey and her father was a dentist and her mother was a teacher. She had a younger brother who died from polio at the age of five. She loved swimming, sailing, canoeing, and was interested in science at an early age. According to one source, she read the biography of Marie Curie which suggested to her that she could succeed in a scientific field despite the prevailing ideas about gender roles at the time. She graduated from Columbia High School in nearby Maplewood in 1944, which would later induct her into its hall of fame in 2007.

Hoover attended Wellesley College where she studied classical and medieval philosophy and history. She graduated from Wellesley in 1948 with honors, earning a bachelor's degree, and she was inducted into Phi Beta Kappa and was honored as a Durant Scholar. She earned her PhD from Yale University in philosophy and foundations of mathematics in 1951.

Career
Hoover was a professor at Swarthmore College from 1951 to 1954 where she taught philosophy and logic. However, she had been unable to win a tenure-track position, possibly because of her gender and marital status, according to one view. In 1953, she married Charles Wilson Hoover, Jr., and he was very supportive of his wife's career pursuits. In 1954, she joined Bell Labs as a senior technical associate, and was promoted in 1956. According to one source, the internal training program was the "equivalent of a master's degree in computer science." Switching systems were moving from electronic to computer-based technologies. Problems happened when a call center would be inundated with thousands of calls in a short amount of time, overwhelming the unreliable electronic relays, and causing the entire system to "freeze up."

Hoover used her knowledge of symbolic logic and feedback theory to program the control mechanisms of a call center to use data about incoming calls to impose order on the whole system. It used computer electronic methods to monitor the frequency of incoming calls at different times. Her method gave priority to processes that were concerned with the input and output of the switch over processes that were less important such as record keeping and billing. The computer, as a result, would adjust the call center's acceptance rate automatically, greatly reducing the overloading problem. The system became known as stored program control.

Hoover's thinking about the invention happened while she was in a hospital recuperating after having given birth to her second daughter, according to several sources. Lawyers for Bell Labs handling the patent had to go to her house to visit her while she was on maternity leave so that she could sign the papers. The result of the invention was much more robust service to callers during peak load times:

For her invention, termed Feedback Control Monitor for Stored Program Data Processing System, Hoover was awarded patent #3,623,007 in November 1971, one of the first software patents ever issued. The patent was applied for in 1967 and issued in 1971. As a result of her invention, she became the first woman supervisor of a technical department at Bell Labs. She headed the operations support department in 1987. The principles of her invention are still being used in telecommunications equipment in the 21st century.

Hoover worked on various high-level applications such as research radar control programs of the Safeguard Anti-Ballistic Missile System, which were systems to intercept incoming intercontinental ballistic missile warheads. Her department worked on artificial intelligence methods, large databases, and transactional software to support large telephone networks. She worked at Bell Labs for 32 years until retiring in 1987. In addition, she served on the boards of higher education organizations in New Jersey. As a member of the board of Trustees of  The College of New Jersey, she was described as a visionary who was instrumental in increasing women faculty as well as enrolling the "best prepared high school graduates" in the state, and she helped build the college into a respected institution of higher education by lobbying extensively for state funding.

Awards
She was awarded one of the first patents for computer software. She was elected as a member of the National Inventors Hall of Fame in 2008. She received the Wellesley College alumni achievement award.

References

External links
Biography of Hoover from the Lemelson-MIT Program 
Biography of Hoover from the Engineering and Technology History Wiki

1926 births
Living people
20th-century American inventors
Women inventors
American women engineers
Scientists at Bell Labs
Wellesley College alumni
Yale University alumni
Columbia High School (New Jersey) alumni
People from Irvington, New Jersey
21st-century American women